Bodmin General railway station, located in Bodmin, Cornwall, United Kingdom, was the terminus of the Great Western Railway's Bodmin branch line, and is now the principal railway station of the heritage Bodmin & Wenford Railway.

History

The Great Western Railway opened a terminus in Bodmin on 27 May 1887, the line diverging from the Cornish Main Line at Bodmin Road. On 3 September 1888 a new line was opened to join with the Bodmin and Wadebridge line at Boscarne Junction.  Bodmin General remained a terminus, so trains running through had to reverse here and retrace their journey for a few yards before bearing right just beyond the station.

The single-sided platform had two adjacent lines, the nearer being used as a run-round and the further being furnished with a goods shed beyond which another curving siding served a cattle dock. At the end of the platform was the signal box and beyond this were two sidings, one housing an engine shed; the junction being on the running line immediately beyond this. A short refuge siding was added to the Bodmin Road line in June 1928, and further on a connection into Fulford Trumps siding was added in April 1973.

The station was originally named Bodmin and, after nationalisation, became Bodmin General on 26 September 1949, in order to distinguish it from other stations in the area ( and Bodmin Road).

The engine shed closed in April 1962, and passenger services ceased on 30 January 1967. Freight services were withdrawn from Bodmin General on 1 May 1967 and the signal box closed later that year. The line officially closed on 3 October 1983 following the demise of freight traffic from Wenford.

Stationmasters

William Henry Smale 1887 - 1898 (afterwards station master at Torre)
Thomas Henry Hunt 1899 - 1908 (formerly station master at Chipping Norton)
W.A. Glasson 1908 - 1910
Percy Joseph Molyneaux 1911 - 1918 (formerly station master at Penryn)
W.C. Wenmoth 1918 - 1935
Edward Leslie Morris ca. 1939
Cecil Aubrey Stephens 1947 - 1965 (formerly station master at Horrabridge)

Bodmin & Wenford Railway
The Bodmin & Wenford Railway, a heritage railway, uses Bodmin General as its principal station. In February 2020, a second platform was opened.

An engine shed and workshops is situated adjacent to the station. The workshops are open for inspection when trains are running.

Services

References

Former Great Western Railway stations
Railway stations in Great Britain opened in 1887
Railway stations in Great Britain closed in 1967
Heritage railway stations in Cornwall
Bodmin and Wenford Railway
Beeching closures in England
Bodmin